Sunny Side Up is an album by jazz saxophonist Lou Donaldson recorded for the Blue Note label and performed by Donaldson with Bill Hardman, Horace Parlan, Sam Jones, Al Harewood, with Laymon Jackson replacing Jones on four tracks.

Reception
The album was awarded 3 stars in an Allmusic review by Stephen Thomas Erlewine, who states: "Sunny Side Up is closer to hard bop than the straight-ahead bop that characterized Lou Donaldson's '50s Blue Note records. There's a bit more soul to the songs here.... Even the uptempo numbers sound relaxed, never fiery. Despite the general smoothness of the session, Donaldson stumbles a little but there's enough solid material to make Sunny Side Up a worthwhile listen for fans of Donaldson and early-'60s hard bop."

Track listing
 "Blues for J.P." (Horace Parlan) - 5:39
 "The Man I Love" (Gershwin, Gershwin) - 5:14
 "Politely" (Bill Hardman) - 5:52
 "It's You or No One" (Cahn, Styne) - 3:58
 "The Truth" (Lou Donaldson) - 5:21
 "Goose Grease" (Donaldson) - 6:07
 "Softly, As in a Morning Sunrise" (Oscar Hammerstein II, Sigmund Romberg) - 6:32
 "Way Down Upon the Swanee River" (Stephen Foster) - 5:39 Bonus track on CD reissue

Recorded  on February 5 (tracks 3 & 6-8) and February 28 (tracks 1-2 & 4-5), 1960.

Personnel
 Lou Donaldson - alto saxophone
 Horace Parlan - piano
 Bill Hardman - trumpet (tracks 1-4, 6-8)
 Laymon Jackson - bass (tracks 1-2, 4-5)
 Sam Jones - bass (tracks 3, 6-8)
 Al Harewood - drums

Production
 Alfred Lion - producer
 Reid Miles - design
 Rudy Van Gelder - recording engineer
 Francis Wolff - photography

References

Lou Donaldson albums
1961 albums
Blue Note Records albums
Albums produced by Alfred Lion
Albums recorded at Van Gelder Studio